Siroheme (or sirohaem) is a heme-like prosthetic group at the active sites of some enzymes to accomplish the six-electron reduction of sulfur and nitrogen.  It is a cofactor at the active site of sulfite reductase, which plays a major role in sulfur assimilation pathway, converting sulfite into sulfide, which can be incorporated into the organic compound homocysteine.

Biosynthesis
Like all tetrapyrroles, the macrocyclic ligand in siroheme is derived from uroporphyrinogen III.  This porphyrinogen is methylated at two adjacent pyrrole rings to give dihydrosirohydrochlorin, which is subsequently oxidized to give sirohydrochlorin.  A ferrochelatase then inserts iron into the macrocycle to give siroheme.

See also
 Ferredoxin-nitrite reductase
 Hydrogensulfite reductase
 Nitrite reductase (NAD(P)H)

References

Further reading

Iron enzymes
Sulfur enzymes
Sulfur metabolism
Tetrapyrroles